EFGaming was a professional gaming organization for Counter-Strike: Source, formed in December 2005 by former Check-Six (x6) / PowersGaming members. Considered by many as the top Counter-Strike: Source team in North America, they won many LAN tournaments, with most recent the "Ryu LAN Event", November 2006. In April 2008 most of EFGaming went to the San Francisco Optx of the Championship Gaming Series. The team was named after the daughter of one of the team's managers. Matthew "Erd" Grover wrote a letter of resignation on their website in 2008, stating that they were not planning to continue EFGaming activities under that name.

EFGaming's Roster
 Moe "mOE" Assad
 Josh "dominator" Sievers (formerly of Team 3D, led by Craig "Torbull" Levine)
 Laurent "Warmach1ne" Keoula
 Yaz "clowN" Ammari
 Trevor "p0s" Randolph
 Johnny "r0ckst4r" Clark (who left due to his band, "red red wine")
 Ryan "phamm" Pham (formerly of United 5, led by Jason "moses" O'Toole)
 Lloyd "shaffeR" Shaffer
 Chris "deppy" DePaul 
 Justin "Sunman" Summy
 Ben "Flodog" Taylor 
 Jarred "Remix" Shaw

Owners/Managers 
 John "Brex" Atwell
 Matthew "Erd" Grover
 Stephanie "Princess" (Assistant)

Accomplishments
9th-12th place Everlan 2006
1st place Gigabits 2006
1st place LANFest 2006
1st place TXGF Summer Event 
1st place Ryu LAN Event 2006
1st place Championship Gaming Invitational 2007

Sponsors

Nuclear Fallout
Icemat Audio
Steel Series
Xfire
Hype Energy Drinks
iBuypower.com

References

External links
 EFGaming official website (archived)

Video game organizations
Defunct and inactive Counter-Strike teams
2008 disestablishments in the United States
Esports teams based in the United States
Esports teams established in 2005
Esports teams disestablished in 2008